Cardiopetalum is a genus of flowering plants belonging to the family Annonaceae.

Its native range is Southern Tropical America.

Species:

Cardiopetalum calophyllum 
Cardiopetalum plicatum 
Cardiopetalum surinamense

References

Annonaceae
Annonaceae genera